Laguna Park is an unincorporated community and census-designated place (CDP) in Bosque County in central Texas, United States. As of the 2010 census, it had a population of 1,276.

The community is situated at the southern end of Lake Whitney, near the dam.

Following the completion of Whitney Dam in the early 1950s, Laguna Park became a recreation destination. Small stores and a post office opened to serve the surrounding agricultural area as well as visitors to Lake Whitney. The population stood at just under 500 during the mid-1970s, but slowly grew to approximately 550 by 2000.

Public education in the community of Laguna Park is provided by the Clifton Independent School District.

References

External links
 http://www.lagunapark.org

 http://www.lagunapark.net
 http://www.lagunapark.org

Census-designated places in Bosque County, Texas
Unincorporated communities in Texas
Census-designated places in Texas
Unincorporated communities in Bosque County, Texas